The QX-04, or Q×4 (styled similarly to the Px4), is a semi-automatic pistol in limited use with the People's Liberation Army (PLA) and various Chinese police departments. Chongqing ChangFeng Machinery LTD.CO designed the gun under China South Industries Group Corporation in June 2010. It is primarily targeted for international market and exportation.

Design Details 
The pistol features a series of four different calibers, including 9×19mm Luger, .45 ACP, 7.62×25mm Tokarev and .40 S&W. By changing the slide, barrel, and magazine, it can fire all the four available calibers. This concept can be seen in other designs such as Beretta Px4 Storm. The production variant of QX-04, named CS/LP6 first appeared in public during 8th China International Exhibition on Police Equipment in May 2011.

QX-04 shares a similar structure with the QSZ-92 service pistol yet differs in some aspects. The gun uses a unique operating principle wherein by the barrel is fluted in an opposite twist of the rifling. This fluting causes the pistol when fired to exert opposite rotational force on the barrel therein by locking the front of the slide to the barrel until the fired round leaves the gun. The action of the QX-04 can be seen as similar to that of the Savage made 1907 Automatic Handgun. It is still unclear as of this time if the weapon is considered a delayed-blowback or a retarded blowback pistol.

References

External links
http://modernfirearms.net/en/handguns/handguns-en/china-semi-automatic-pistols/qx4-eng/

.40 S&W semi-automatic pistols
.45 ACP semi-automatic pistols
7.62×25mm Tokarev semi-automatic pistols
9mm Parabellum semi-automatic pistols
Semi-automatic pistols of the People's Republic of China